The 1988 DuPont Classic was a men's tennis tournament played on outdoor hard courts in Orlando, Florida, United States that was part of the 1988 Grand Prix circuit. It was the fourth edition of the tournament and took place from March 7 through March 12, 1988. Unseeded Andrei Chesnokov won the singles title and earned $59,000 first-prize money.

Finals

Singles
 Andrei Chesnokov defeated  Miloslav Mečíř 7–6(8–6), 6–1
 It was Chesnokov's 1st singles title of the year and the 2nd of his career.

Doubles
 Guy Forget /  Yannick Noah defeated  Sherwood Stewart /  Kim Warwick 6–4, 6–4

References

External links
 ITF tournament edition details

Prudential-Bache Securities Classic